"Drunk" is a 1953 Jimmy Liggins song. The song was released on Art Rupe's Specialty Records with another Liggins' composition "I'll Never Let You Go" as the B-side. The song "Drunk" has been covered by many artists including Ace Cannon (1971) and Steve Tallis (1986).

The lyrics include the line "Came home one night with a spinning in my head/reached for the pillow, missed the whole darned bed".

The single was a top ten best seller at the end of 1953 into January 1954, according to the Billboard charts, and in the top five of tracks played on jukeboxes.

References

1953 songs
Specialty Records singles